Mahavir Stadium, built in 1972, is a multipurpose sports complex located in Hisar city of Haryana, India. It has second largest capacity in Haryana, after the Shah Satnam Ji Cricket Stadium in Sirsa which has a higher capacity of 35,000 spectators. It is owned and operated by the District Olympic Association of Hisar. The venue is used for several events, such as cricket and football.

In athletics, at least 40 national and 6 international athletes are from Hisar. In handball, at least 20 players from hisar have represented India at international level, among them at least 6 are from Ladwa. Though Hisar has produced large number of national and international players, and there at 4 universities and 31 degree colleges, there are no institutes offering courses such as B.P.Ed and M.P.Ed to develop sports coaches.

History
It was built in 1972 and named as "Nehru Stadium" on its inauguration, renamed as the "Mahabir Stadium" in 1987, and renovated in 1988.

Location
It located is about 5 km from the Guru Jambheshwar University of Science and Technology; 4 km from the Blue Bird Lake; 2 km from the bus station along the National Highway 9, 1 km from the town center & main market area; 1 km from Hisar Junction railway station; 6 km from the Hisar Airport; 167 km from the Indira Gandhi International Airport; 180 km from the New Delhi railway station; and 235 km from the Chandigarh International Airport.

Infrastructure 
The seating capacity of the stadium is 25,000 and provides facilities for athletics, basketball, boxing, football, gymnastics, judo, volleyball, wrestling and yoga. The stadium is lit with floodlights and more than 1000 players daily use it for practice.

Mahabir Stadium Boxing Academy
The Hisar Boxing Academy for male and female boxer is located at Mahabir stadium.

Mahabir Stadium Judo Academy
The Hisar Judo Academy, led by Dr. Sumer Singh Nandal, for male and female Judoka is located at Mahabir stadium. It is the biggest centre for Judo coaching in India.

Mahabir Stadium Wrestling Akhara
The Mahabir Stadium Boxing Academy for male and female wrestlers is located at Mahabir stadium.

Events 
It hosted the 2nd Asian Women's Boxing Championship in 2003 and 51st National Boxing Championship in 2004.

It also hosted 22nd Haryana State Women Sports Festival in 2008.

It also hosted Haryana State Master's Athelerics Championship in May 2014.

Other stadiums in Hisar
 HAU Giri Centre
 GJU Sports Centre
 Hisar International Cricket Stadium: This is coming up on 76 acres land northwest outskirt of Hisar city between Dhandhoor village and BSF camp on the northwest side of the intersection of NH9 Delhi-Hisar-Sirsa route NH52 Hisar-bypass on Rajgarh-Hisar-Barwala-Chandigarh route.

See also

 List of stadiums in India

Nearby attraction

 Shatavar Vatika Herbal Park, Hisar is next to the Deer Park on Dhansu Road
 Blue Bird Lake Hisar
 Kanwari Indus Valley Mound at Kanwari
 Tosham rock inscription at Tosham
 Asigarh Fort at Hansi
 Firoz Shah Palace Complex 
 Pranpir Badshah tomb at Hisar
 Deer Park, Hisar
 Haryana Tourism

References

Buildings and structures in Hisar (city)
Cricket grounds in Haryana
Football venues in Haryana
Multi-purpose stadiums in India
Sports venues in Haryana
1972 establishments in Haryana
Sports venues completed in 1972
20th-century architecture in India